Sir Gordon Freeth, KBE (6 August 191427 November 2001) was an Australian politician and diplomat. He served in the House of Representatives from 1949 to 1969, including as a minister in the Coalition governments from 1958 to 1969. He later served as Ambassador to Japan from 1970 to 1973 and High Commissioner to the United Kingdom from 1977 to 1980.

Early life
Freeth was born in Angaston, South Australia, the son of Robert Freeth (1886–1979) and Gladys Mary Snashall. He attended Sydney Church of England Grammar School and the Guildford Grammar School in Western Australia, where his father was Headmaster from 1928 to 1949.

In 1937 he rowed in the bow seat of the Western Australian men's eight which contested the King's Cup at the Australian Interstate Regatta. He was awarded a Bachelor of Laws by the University of Western Australia in 1938. That same year he was selected to row for Australia and won a gold medal in the coxed fours in the 1938 British Empire Games in Sydney. In 1939 he married Joan Baker and they had twin daughters, Felicity and Susan and a son, Robert.

In 1939, he began practising law in Katanning, Western Australia. With the outbreak of World War II, he joined the Royal Australian Air Force and he flew Beaufort bombers in New Guinea and had been promoted to flight lieutenant by 1945, when he was demobilised.

Political career

Freeth was elected as the Liberal member for Forrest in the 1949 election. He actually finished third on the primary vote behind Labor incumbent and minister Nelson Lemmon and the Country Party's Arnold Potts, a hero of both World Wars. On the third count, however, Potts' preferences flowed overwhelmingly to Freeth, allowing Freeth to defeat Lemmon on a swing of 4.4 percent. Freeth would hold the seat comfortably for most of the next two decades.

He was appointed Minister for the Interior and Minister for Works in 1958 and in 1963 he was appointed Minister for Shipping and Transport. In February 1968, he was appointed Minister for Air, replacing Peter Howson.

He was appointed Minister for Foreign Affairs, replacing Paul Hasluck, in February 1969 when Hasluck became Governor-General. In this role, Freeth made some unfortunate comments about relations with Russia, which in the Cold War atmosphere of the times were interpreted as being somewhat 'soft on communism'.

Freeth was defeated at the 1969 election by the Australian Labor Party candidate, Frank Kirwan. His defeat at a time when the government of which he was a part was generally secure was attributed in part to his statements about relations with Russia, but also to discontent by farmers in his largely rural electorate who were suffering a degree of economic recession at the time.

Freeth was Ambassador to Japan from 1970 to 1973 and High Commissioner to the United Kingdom from 1977 to 1980.

Death
Freeth died in Perth in 2001, predeceased by his wife, but survived by his three children.

Honours
Freeth was made a Knight Commander of the Order of the British Empire (KBE) in 1978.

References

1914 births
2001 deaths
Liberal Party of Australia members of the Parliament of Australia
Members of the Australian House of Representatives
Members of the Australian House of Representatives for Forrest
Australian Knights Commander of the Order of the British Empire
Australian politicians awarded knighthoods
Members of the Cabinet of Australia
Australian ministers for Foreign Affairs
Royal Australian Air Force officers
Rowers at the 1938 British Empire Games
Commonwealth Games gold medallists for Australia
People educated at Guildford Grammar School
High Commissioners of Australia to the United Kingdom
Permanent Representatives of Australia to the International Maritime Organization
Ambassadors of Australia to Japan
Australian male rowers
People from Angaston, South Australia
Commonwealth Games medallists in rowing
20th-century Australian politicians
University of Western Australia alumni
People educated at Sydney Church of England Grammar School
20th-century Australian public servants
Royal Australian Air Force personnel of World War II
Australian World War II pilots
Medallists at the 1938 British Empire Games